NGC 3008 is a lenticular galaxy with an active galactic nucleus in the constellation of Ursa Major, discovered by William Parsons and his assistants. It is about 40 thousand light years across, and with a recessional velocity of about 4,785 kilometers per second, is at a distance of 240 million light-years from the Sun.

It is a member of the NGC 2998 group, which also includes NGC 2998, NGC 3002, NGC 3005, NGC 3006, and a few others.

References

External links 
 

Lenticular galaxies
3008
Ursa Major (constellation)
028252